Văleni is a commune in Neamț County, Western Moldavia, Romania. It is composed of four villages: David, Moreni, Munteni and Văleni. These were part of Botești Commune until 2004, when they were split off.

References

Communes in Neamț County
Localities in Western Moldavia